Nicki (born Doris Andrea Hrda; November 2, 1966 in the town of Plattling (in the Deggendorf district of Bavaria, Germany) is a German pop singer and composer. She currently lives with her life partner and their two daughters in Plattling.

Career 

Hrda grew up with three brothers and two sisters in Plattling. In 1982, she was at a talent competition when producer/songwriter Gog Seidl discovered her and signed her to a record contract. Her stage name of "Nicki" was thought up by pop star Sandra (of Enigma fame).

In 1983, she released her first single, Servus, mach's gut, a hit in the Bavarian dialect. Shortly after, in 1984, she released her first full-length album, Servus Nicki. Throughout her singing career, Nicki remained loyal to the Bavarian dialect. She had numerous other titles with great success, including So a Wunder, Wegen Dir, Mei Schönster Traum, I Bin a Bayerisches Cowgirl, Samstag Nacht, Doch die Zeit Bleibt Steh'n, and Du Bist in Meiner Macht.

The musical range of the 4'11" singer includes styles like rock, calypso, Motown – Soul, Synthpop and even country music. Nicki's biggest hits were composed by Harald Steinhauer, with lyrics by Helmut Frey.

In 1999, Nicki committed herself as a patron for the German Childhood Cancer Foundation. In more recent years, Nicki has withdrawn from the entertainment business to focus on her family life. However, in September 2006 she made a comeback with a new album, I gib wieder Gas, but it was not to last. In December, she announced that she would be retiring again, this time citing health reasons. All PR events and 2007 tour schedules were canceled.

Discography

Albums

Singles

References

External links 

The official Nicki page (in German)

1966 births
Living people
Virgin Records artists
Nicki